Léonie Villard (1890–1962) was a French literary critic and professor at the Université de Lyon. She was the first woman to be a professor of literature at a French university. In 1917 she received the Rose Mary Crawshay Prize for her book,  Jane Austen: Sa Vie et Son Oeuvre. She was also a member of the faculty of Mount Holyoke College in 1937 and 1950–1951. The college holds her diary of life in Vichy France during the Second World War.

Selected publications
 Jane Austen: Sa Vie et Son Oeuvre. 1915.
 La Femme anglaise au XIXe siècle et son évolution d'après le roman anglais contemporain. Paris, 1920.
 Le Théâtre Américain. Boivin & Cie, Paris, c. 1929.
 La Poésie Américaine. Trois siècles de poésie lyrique et de poèmes narratifs. Paris, 1945.
 Essai de Psychologie de la Grammaire Anglaise. Paris, 1957.

References

External links 

1890 births
1962 deaths
Academic staff of the University of Lyon
English literature academics
French literary critics
Women literary critics
French women academics
Mount Holyoke College faculty
French diarists
Women diarists
20th-century French women
20th-century diarists